Pedro Agramunt Font de Mora (born 12 September 1951) is a Spanish and European politician. Agramunt is from Valencia and has served as a member of the Senate of Spain since 2008. He had previously represented Valencia Province in the Spanish Congress of Deputies from 1989 to 1991 and in the Corts Valencianes, the Valencian regional parliament, from 1991 to 1994. He is a prominent member of the People's Party (Spain). He has also been a Chairman of the European People's Party since January 2016 and is active in the Parliamentary Assembly of the Council of Europe, being president until his resignation on 6 October 2017.

Agramunt is an advocate for further European integration, and has spoken in favour of supporting Ukraine.

Education and personal life 
According to his official biography, Agramunt holds a degree in law from the University of Valencia. Agramunt's biography also says that he graduated from the Instituto de Estudios Superiores de la Empresa (IESE) in Barcelona, having studied Management Development (1980).

Agramunt has been married since 1979 and has two children.

Controversy 
Although Agramunt has a low profile in non-Spanish media, he is the focus of significant controversy, as he is the rapporteur of the Parliamentary Assembly of the Council of Europe on political prisoners in Azerbaijan. Human rights activists have criticized Agramunt for his proximity to the regime in Azerbaijan, and have highlighted that he has done little to highlight numerous violations of human rights. Leyla Yunus, one of the Azerbaijani human rights activists that had criticized Agramunt in June 2014, has since been arrested, on charges that Human Rights Watch characterized as "bogus".

In 2013, the European Stability Initiative pressed for Agramunt to resign from his position as rapporteur, alleging that he had covered up systematic violations of Human rights in Azerbaijan.  In 2017 in the report entitled “The Azerbaijani Laundromat” published by the Organized Crime and Corruption Reporting Project as result of an investigative journalism, Agramunt was mentioned to be benefiting from Azerbaijani scheme of money laundering. Furthermore, he played a key role in rigging various votes at PACE in favour of Azerbaijan

On 28 April 2017, after travelling to Syria to meet Bashar al-Assad, the Bureau of PACE said he is no longer authorized to undertake any official visits, attend meetings, or make public statements on behalf of the assembly in his capacity as president after a vote of no confidence on him.
His partiality as a President of PACE was proven and he eventually resigned as the President of Parliamentary Assembly of the Council of Europe on October 6, 2017.

References

1951 births
People's Party (Spain) politicians
Living people
Members of the Senate of Spain
People from Valencia
Members of the 4th Congress of Deputies (Spain)
University of Valencia alumni
Members of the 3rd Corts Valencianes
Members of the 4th Corts Valencianes